Martin Rios (born 24 May 1981) is a Spanish-Swiss curler. He competed in the 2018 Winter Olympics in the mixed doubles tournament with partner Jenny Perret, winning a silver medal. He is two-time (2012, 2017) World Mixed Doubles Champion and 2011 European Mixed Champion. At the 2012 World Mixed Doubles Curling Championship he was partnered with Nadine Lehmann and at the 2017 World Mixed Doubles Curling Championship he was paired with Perret. Rios also won a bronze medal at the 2014 European Mixed Curling Championship.

In addition to representing his native Switzerland, Rios has twice represented Spain internationally, at the 2007 and the 2008 European Curling Championships.

He currently serves as a national coach with the Swiss Curling Association.

References

External links
 

1981 births
Living people
Swiss male curlers
Swiss people of Spanish descent
Spanish people of Swiss descent
Spanish male curlers
World mixed doubles curling champions
European curling champions
Swiss curling champions
Olympic curlers of Switzerland
Curlers at the 2018 Winter Olympics
Medalists at the 2018 Winter Olympics
Olympic silver medalists for Switzerland
Olympic medalists in curling
People from Glarus
Swiss curling coaches
Competitors at the 2007 Winter Universiade
Curlers at the 2022 Winter Olympics